The April 2018 North American storm complex brought a wide swath of severe and winter weather that affected much of Midwest across to the East Coast of the United States. This particular outbreak led to at least 73 confirmed tornadoes over a three-day period, most of which occurred across Arkansas and Louisiana during the evening hours of April 13. The most significant tornadoes were an EF1 that caused a fatality in Red Chute, Louisiana, early on April 14, an upper-end EF2 tornado that impacted eastern sections of Greensboro, North Carolina on April 15, causing 17 injuries, and a significant EF3 tornado that impacted areas from Lynchburg to Elon, Virginia, causing severe damage and at least 10 injuries. 

The system also resulted in a record-breaking and severe blizzard across the Midwest into the Northeastern United States; killing three additional people and leaving hundreds of thousands without power.

Meteorological synopsis

April 13–14
On April 8, the Storm Prediction Center (SPC) first introduced a risk of severe weather in their day 6 outlook, valid on April 13. The threat area included the South Plains and the Mid-South from northeastern Texas into southern Missouri, where maturing convection was expected to lead to all modes of severe weather. Subsequent day 5 and day 4 forecasts maintained this area with little deviation. In its day 3 outlook on April 11, the SPC issued an Enhanced risk of severe weather for areas between northeastern Texas into southwestern Missouri, noting that a supercellular storm mode was likely to produce large hail, damaging winds, and a few tornadoes. The Enhanced risk was later extended northward into southern Iowa on April 12, and by the following morning, a Moderate risk was issued across far northeastern Texas and northwestern Louisiana onward into central Arkansas. Several tornadoes, including some strong (EF2+) ones, were expected in the highest risk area. As a result, the outlook included a 15% hatched risk area for tornadoes.

An outbreak of tornadoes unfolded across the region as an expansive upper-level trough pushed into the Central United States, along with a 100kt jet streak pushing into Oklahoma and Missouri. A surface area of low pressure tracked from North-Central Kansas toward the Missouri-Iowa state border, supporting a warm front arced across southern Iowa, and a dryline extending from Kansas into Texas. Within the warm sector of the low, surface dewpoints rose to the mid 60s. A swath of 850mb winds at or above 50kt persisted underneath an elevated mixed layer, yielding an unstable environment characterized by mean-layer Convective Available Potential Energy (CAPE) of 1500–2500 J/kg. Throughout the afternoon, confluent low-level flow caused several discrete thunderstorms to form across Arkansas, where the SPC had issued a Particularly Dangerous Situation (PDS) tornado watch. The most significant supercell of the day developed over LeFlore County, Oklahoma and eventually progressed into Crawford County, Arkansas, where it produced a half-mile-wide EF2 tornado that caused substantial damage in and near Mountainburg.

Into the evening hours of April 13, the low-level jet kept intensified across Arkansas and Louisiana, with 850mb winds topping 60kt. Meanwhile, a cold front pushed eastward and soon overtook the dryline, forcing discrete thunderstorm activity into a quasi-linear convective system. With abundant moisture and mean-layer CAPE still on the order of 1,500–2,000 J/kg, the SPC mentioned potential for swaths of damaging winds with isolated embedded tornadoes. Around 05:10 UTC, an EF1 tornado was developed southwest of Shreveport, Louisiana and progressed directly into the city. It damaged billboards, trees, and hotels before entering Bossier City; there, several mobile homes were damaged and a shopping center was severely devastated. After entering Red Chute, the tornado downed a tree onto a travel trailer, causing one fatality inside. The fatality marked the only tornado-related fatality of the multi-day outbreak. Into the morning hours of April 14, EF2 tornadoes impacted areas near Portland, Arkansas, Carencro, Louisiana, and in Meridian, Mississippi.

April 15
The SPC first mentioned the threat for organized severe weather across the Southeast and Mid-Atlantic regions on April 12, noting that the main threat was expected to be damaging winds. A day 3 Slight risk was outlined for central Florida northward into extreme southern Virginia the next day, with an Enhanced risk of severe weather introduced across much of South Carolina and central North Carolina during the morning hours of April 15. This outlook included a 10% risk area for tornadoes. The potent upper-level trough that sparked severe weather farther west over subsequent days began to tilt in a northwest-to-southeast fashion, forcing rapid cooling aloft and geopotential height falls over a large region. The surface low progressed from Iowa into Ohio and across the Appalachian Mountains, resulting in strong low-level flow and substantial moisture return across the severe weather risk area; dewpoints in the low to mid-60s caused an unstable atmosphere that ultimately led to a quasi-linear convective system and hundreds of damaging wind reports. Embedded semi-discrete supercell structures within this line produced several tornadoes, including EF2 ones that affected areas east of Gilbert, South Carolina and the eastern sections of Greensboro, North Carolina. Another strong tornado moved through the Virginia towns of Timberlake and Lynchburg before reaching EF3 strength as it destroyed several homes in Elon.

Confirmed tornadoes

April 13 event

April 14 event

April 15 event

Winter storm and blizzard
The larger extratropical cyclone, named Xanto by The Weather Channel, responsible for the outbreak also resulted in a record-breaking and severe winter storm and blizzard across the Midwest into the Northeastern United States, as well as neighboring Ontario and Quebec.

United States
Green Bay, Wisconsin, reported , its second-heaviest snowstorm of all time and largest ever for the month of April. In Minneapolis, Minnesota,  of snow fell, which was the largest April snowstorm on record. The storm was officially classified as a blizzard, the first to affect the Minneapolis - St. Paul metropolitan area since 2005. A baseball game where the Minnesota Twins hosted the Chicago White Sox was postponed. The storm contributed to a record-high  of snow for the month of April. Sioux Falls, South Dakota, received  of snow on April 14, making it the heaviest one-day April snow total on record in the city. Further east, a severe ice storm took place. of freezing rain accumulated near Midland, Michigan, and up to an inch of ice was reported in Lowville, New York, in the foothills of the Tug Hill Plateau.  Further east, 42nd Street–Bryant Park/Fifth Avenue station and 145th Street Station flooded, and the flash flooding in New York City also resulted in the Henry Hudson Parkway being closed down. In Edison, New Jersey, flooding forced both sides of Interstate 287 to close. Interstate 76 in Philadelphia also flooded. The 2018 Boston Marathon was held in poor conditions due to the storm.

Canada
In Ontario, a mix of snow, freezing rain, ice pellets and rain battered Toronto and the surrounding area, causing hundreds of vehicle collisions, flight cancellations, power outages and transportation delays. The CN Tower and surrounding areas in downtown Toronto were closed for several days due to falling chunks of ice after the storm. Falling ice also damaged the roof at Rogers Centre, forcing a Toronto Blue Jays game to be postponed. Watch parties for both the Toronto Maple Leafs and Toronto Raptors were cancelled. Freezing rain also caused problems in Ottawa, Montreal, and parts of New Brunswick.

See also
 List of North American tornadoes and tornado outbreaks
 List of United States tornadoes in April 2018

Notes

References

External links
Outbreak summaries from regional National Weather Service offices:

Springfield, Missouri, WFO
Little Rock, Arkansas, WFO
Shreveport, Louisiana, WFO
Jackson, Mississippi, WFO
Tallahassee, Florida, WFO

2018 in Arkansas
2018 in Louisiana
2018 in Texas
2018 in Missouri
2018 in Mississippi
2018 in Florida
2018 in Georgia (U.S. state)
2018 in South Carolina
2018 in North Carolina
2018 in Virginia
2018 in Ohio
2018 in Minnesota
2018 in Michigan
2018 in Wisconsin
2017–18 North American winter
April 2018 events in the United States
Blizzards in the United States
Canada
F2 tornadoes
Tornadoes of 2018
2018 natural disasters in the United States